Emilio Soriano Aladrén (born 29 October 1945 in Zaragoza) is a retired Spanish football referee. He officiated at one match in the 1990 FIFA World Cup and two matches in the UEFA European Championship (one in 1988 and one in 1992).

References
Profile

1945 births
Living people
Sportspeople from Zaragoza
Spanish football referees
FIFA World Cup referees
1990 FIFA World Cup referees
UEFA Euro 1988 referees
UEFA Euro 1992 referees